Krym may refer to:

 Crimea, in Ukrainian and Russian
 Port Krym, a port in Crimea

See also

 
 Crimea (disambiguation)
 Krim (disambiguation)